The A38(M), commonly known as the Aston Expressway, is a motorway in Birmingham, England. It connects the M6 motorway to Aston and Central Birmingham and forms part of the much longer A38 route.

It is extremely unusual as it is the only single carriageway motorway in the United Kingdom and consists of seven lanes with no central reservation, and operates a tidal flow system in an attempt to minimise congestion. Due to the nature of the road, the speed limit is reduced to 50 mph (80 km/h) for most of its length with a very short length of 30 mph (48 km/h), though there are no permanent speed cameras.

When construction work of the motorway began in the late 1960s, many late 19th-century and early 20th-century houses in the Aston area had to be demolished to make way for the new route.

Route
The A38(M) runs from the A5127  through Gravelly Hill Interchange where the A38 joins and then shortly after traffic from the M6 motorway also joins. It then enters a tidal flow section. The road is on a viaduct as it passes through Aston; this section cuts through the grounds of Aston Hall. The road passes through its first junction after . It enters a cutting before reaching the second junction, where the tidal flow ends as does the motorway. The motorway is curved in Aston to avoid an Ansells brewery. The motorway was also crossed by a vinegar pipeline, carrying the condiment from one part of the since-demolished HP Sauce factory to the other.

Dartmouth Circus

The traffic island at Dartmouth Circus was built where Aston Road met with Dartmouth Street, Bracebridge Street and Allesley Street. where the White Hart public house had been sited. 
 A4540 Dartmouth Middleway (previously Dartmouth Street) J13
 A38(M) Aston Expressway
 A38 Aston Road
 A5127 Aston Road

The traffic island at Dartmouth Circus preserves a re-erected Boulton and Watt steam engine. The engine was built in 1817 and used in Netherton at the ironworks of M W Grazebrook.

Tidal flow

The Expressway was the first road in the United Kingdom to introduce tidal flow to allow better management of traffic. Lane use is controlled by means of electronic overhead signs, with one lane always closed to create a buffer between the two directions of travel – there is no central reservation. In the morning, four of the seven lanes are designated for use by traffic heading toward Birmingham city centre, and two lanes for traffic out of the city. In the evening rush hour, this pattern is reversed and four lanes are made available to outbound traffic and two lanes towards the city centre. At all other times, the road runs with three lanes in each direction.

Motorcycles are banned from the red-surfaced central lane, which contains a drainage channel, regardless of how it is being used. This follows a fatal accident which occurred when one of the drainage covers dislodged.

Junctions

See also

 List of motorways in the United Kingdom
 Transport in Birmingham

References

External links

 CBRD Motorway Database – A38(M)
CBRD Videos – A38(M)
 Pathetic Motorways – A38(M)
 The Motorway Archive – A38(M)

Motorways in England
Transport in Birmingham, West Midlands
Roads in the West Midlands (county)
Roads with a reversible lane